Kenyatta A.C. Hinkle (born 1987) is also known as Olomidara Yaya. She is an American artist, author, and Assistant Professor at the University of California at Berkeley Department of Art Practice. Her work focuses on questions of race, sexuality, and history through a variety of visual and textual mediums. She lives and works in Los Angeles, California. Notable works include the Kentifrica project, the Tituba series, The Evanesced, and the Uninvited series. She is a member of CTRL+SHFT Collective in Oakland, California.

Early life
Hinkle was born in Louisville, Kentucky in 1987. She is of Kentifrica descent, and has created artworks around this part of her identity. Hinkle was inspired by her mother, herself an artist, who, due to the fact that they lived in the segregated South, was unable to pursue her creative identity. Hinkle's mother enforced the idea of "powerful self-possession" into her, which is why Hinkle does not shy away from tough issues in the world.

She lived in Baltimore, MD while studying at the Maryland Institute College of Art where she sometimes attended local slam poetry events.

Education
Kenyatta A.C. Hinkle studied painting (BFA) at Maryland Institute College of Art and writing (MFA) at California Institute of the Arts.  She studied at the AICAD New York Studio Program, Brooklyn, NY from 2008 to 2009. She was a US Fulbright Fellow in Lagos Nigeria from 2015–2016.

Career
Hinkle was the youngest artist in the Made in LA Biennial. Her work, both performed and presented, has been featured in the Hammer Museum in Los Angeles, California, Project Row Houston in Houston, Texas, The California African American Museum, and The Studio Museum in Harlem in New York.

In 2014, Kenyatta and six other black women created and led an event called Call & Response where each artist bought an object and explained what the object meant to them. Kenyatta also led a panel with the question "Kentifrica is or Kentifrica ain't?" Students, faculty at the Antioch University also presented the research they found on Kentifrica. She was included in the 2019 traveling exhibition Young, Gifted, and Black: The Lumpkin-Boccuzzi Family Collection of Contemporary Art.

Style and themes

"[Kenyatta A.C. Hinkle's] work investigates race, sexuality and history using historical objects in visual and performance art constructs." A central mantra to her work is the concept of a 'Historical Present', which is defined as "the residue of history and how it affects our contemporary world perspective".

It is essential to understand Kentifrican culture in order to understand Hinkle as an artist. Kentifrica is "a physical and theoretical location conceived by Hinkle. Holding [her] investments in geography, Diaspora, personal vs. collective histories, and the problematics of museum space, Kentifrican artifacts in the gallery space often assume an active role in each shows' narrative". This culture places great value and emphasis on the community, which can be seen in the ways Hinkle assembles objects together to interrogate the colonial and white gaze. Themes of fluid sexuality and collective responsibility that are important to Kentifrican culture, are also present in the tactics Hinkle employs in her works. They form close social circles and gender based roles are not prevalent. Through the community they educate and provide social well-being. The practices and independence of this culture have prevailed even as other cultures have been dominated by European powers. The presence of this concept in Hinkle's work has a goal: "the Kentifrican figure has a distinct role to heal and empower people who are soft-targets for manipulation and abuse".

She often uses photographs with her artworks and explores what could result from that. For instance, some of her artworks can be seen as nude, but the subject or object is covered in some forms. Her work The Contagion (2012) showed, a young African girl not wearing any clothes but there were thick red scribbly lines from her chest up to her head. While her feet seem to be tied down with some thick black scribbly lines. This work communicated the emotional and uninvited of those emotions and feeling.

Artworks

Tituba Series 
In Hinkle's drawing series, Tituba, she was inspired by Maryse Condé’s novel "I, Tituba: Black Witch of Salem" and relating to Tituba's experiences of being accused as a witch while recalling her own experiences of ostracization as a pregnant black woman. Her goal is to merge the experiences of inhabiting a black, pregnant body and the thought of the otherness that Condé depicted by expanding on the background of Tituba's life.

"It is this body that people don't know what to do with and so some of that discomfort [is] important to keep in there."

The Kentifrica Project 
In Hinkle's The Kentrifrica Project, her goal is to create a collaborative space to examine Diaspora and cultural visibility. She invites communities to aid her in reconstructing the Kentrifican Identity, of having an African background and originating from Kentucky, through leading workshops and discussions that further expand its concept. "The project draws on the collective histories of the artist, collaborators, and participants, as well as historical migration narratives, music, and food to create various elements of Kentifrican culture." The exhibition itself consists of objects that are specifically Kentrifican, including recipes, instruments, clothing, adornments, and maps. Cultural concepts that Hinkle emphasized within Kentrifica is the absence of property ownership and a collective culture.

"Through the embodiment of various voices and modes of address, Hinkle examines what happens to bodies in transit and how they are contextualized culturally depending upon historical hegemonic signifiers of race and culture."

The Evanesced 
In Hinkle's work The Evanesced, which means to gradually fade away, she creates amorphous representations of bodies, some feature dashes of color to accent certain parts of them. Hinkle offers a social  commentary on missing Black women in American and the African Diaspora. She tries to give them voices through her work. She uses minimalist imagery yet is provocative, which further represents the meaning of the series. "The women [...] are surrounded by brushstrokes and lines that seem to slide them onto the canvas, like ghosts that happened to materialize within her paintings".  She has an ability to use certain dualities in order to get the most out of her audience. Here she is very confrontational with the issues of sex trafficking, kidnappings, murder and other reasons for these disappearances, but at the same time she is creating sympathy and a call to action for these women. This call to action connects Hinkle's work to social justice movements by tying in The Evanesced to the #SayHerName Movement.

The series also includes a performance entitled The Evanesced: Embodied Disappearance. The performance draws on similar themes, and has a similar impact:"The Evanesced: Embodied Disappearance centers the death and ever-present afterlife of Black women to hold space for pain, remembrance, and healing". The performance piece, featuring Hinkle and her son, includes "a soundtrack of whispers, shuffles, and popular and underground music". The performance piece adds to the visual series - a multi-dimensional examination of erasure and violence within the Black female experience.

The Uninvited 
In Hinkle's series The Uninvited, she is trying to reclaim the subjects humanity and no longer make them subject to objectivity. Hinkle uses the mass production nature of the postcards in her favor. The postcard format is deliberate, and adds to the meaning of the work, "Hinkle creates disruptive counternarratives by drawing and painting on top of late nineteenth and early twentieth-century postcards of West African women taken mainly by French colonists. These ethnographic photos sought to brand Black women's bodies as dehumanized figments of hypersexualization and conquest, triggering both repulsion and desire". These postcards were once used to further the objectification of the women and strengthen the power of the viewer, as well as a tool of the French colonists. Hinkle is challenging this power dynamic by covering up the women and giving them the power to dictate what is shown. She is exposing the harsh nature and sad reality that women are subjected to by men. At the same time, she is covering the women's bare bodies from the viewers. Hinkle "reconstructs and reimagines the women [from the postcards] through vivid drawings and unique placements on the canvas - in a sense restoring their loss of power". The role and obligation of the viewer is put into question here. It is said that photography is inherently violent, and yet many people indulge in this medium. Hinkle is also calling for people to face the horrific consequences of subjecting someone. There is a discomfort in the women's faces, but they are being seen as objects, and objects don't have voices. Hinkle is trying to get her audience to see the wrong that is being committed. Others have seen the drawn on lines as a representation of disease, this disease is colonialism.

Similarly to The Evanesced, The Uninvited dwells in history, but connects to the present, furthering the notion of a 'Historical Present' which is so central to Hinkle's work. In this series, she has connected the way West African women were treated in the French colonies with how Black women are treated in America today. Explaining the effect she hoped to create with the series, Hinkle stated in an interview: "Working with these women and having them transform me and me transform them, the whole body of work has literally been healing. I do a lot of my work [with] that idea of turning trauma into art". In all of her work, Kenyatta A.C. Hinkle uses the 'Historical Present' to turn past trauma into current healing through art.

Bibliography 

 Hinkle, Kenyatta A. C. (2018). Kentrifications: Convergent Truth(s) and Realities. Los Angeles, Calif: Occidental College. OCLC 1108338028
 Hinkle, Kenyatta A. C. (2019). Sir. Brooklyn, New York: Litmus Press. ISBN 9781933959382.

Recognition
Hinkle is the recipient of several fellowships and grants including the Rema Hort Mann Foundation Emerging Artist Award, the Cultural Center for Innovation's Investing in Artists Grant, Social Practice in Art (SPart-LA), and the Jacob K. Javits Full Fellowship for Graduate Study. She is a recent alumna (2015–2016) of the US Fulbright Program in which she conducted research at the University of Lagos in Lagos, Nigeria.

Her performance and project Kentifrica was featured in the Made in L.A. 2012, making her the youngest artist featured.

References

External links
 The Kentifrican Museum of Culture: An Extension of the Kentifrica Project
 Kach Studio (artist's website)

1987 births
Living people
American multimedia artists
Artists from Los Angeles
American women artists
Artists from Louisville, Kentucky
21st-century American women artists